Pure red cell aplasia (PRCA) or erythroblastopenia refers to a type of aplastic anemia affecting the precursors to red blood cells but usually not to white blood cells. In PRCA, the bone marrow ceases to produce red blood cells. There are multiple etiologies that can cause PRCA. The condition has been first described by Paul Kaznelson in 1922.

Signs and symptoms 
Signs and symptoms may include:

 Pale appearance
 Rapid heart rate
 Fatigue

Causes
Causes of PRCA include:

Treatment
PRCA is considered an autoimmune disease as it will respond to immunosuppressant treatment such as cyclosporin in many patients, though this approach is not without risk.

It has also been shown to respond to treatments with rituximab and tacrolimus.

See also
 Diamond–Blackfan anemia (genetic red cell aplasia)
 Aplastic anemia (aplasia affecting other bone marrow cells as well)

References

External links 

Aplastic anemias